Living in a Magazine is the debut studio album by Zoot Woman. It was released through Wall of Sound in 2001. It peaked at number 38 on the UK Independent Albums Chart.

Critical reception

Tim DiGravina of AllMusic gave the album 4 stars out of 5, saying, "Les Rhythmes Digitales' Stuart Price clearly plays a key role in the band, but he reins in his funky electronic musings, allowing the album to take on a subtle, jazzy feel as it honors the sound of 1980s synth pop." NME named it the 49th best album of 2001.

Track listing

Personnel
Credits adapted from liner notes.

Zoot Woman
 Adam Blake
 Johnny Blake
 Stuart Price

Technical personnel
 Jim Abbis – mixing (2)
 Mike Marsh – mastering
 Tom Hingston Studio – art direction, design
 Sølve Sundsbø – photography
 Fee Doran – styling
 Jo Reynolds – hair, make-up

Charts

References

External links
 
 

2001 debut albums
Zoot Woman albums
Albums produced by Stuart Price
Wall of Sound (record label) albums